Pope Peter of Alexandria may refer to:

 Pope Peter I of Alexandria, ruled in 300–311
 Pope Peter II of Alexandria, ruled in 373–380
 Pope Peter III of Alexandria, ruled in 477–490
 Pope Peter IV of Alexandria, ruled in 565–569
 Pope Peter V of Alexandria, ruled in 1340–1348
 Pope Peter VI of Alexandria, ruled in 1718–1726
 Pope Peter VII of Alexandria, ruled in 1809–1852